HMS Spey was a sixth rate post ship, launched for the Royal Navy in 1814 towards the end of the Napoleonic Wars. She had a short naval career, serving on the St Helena and Malta stations. While on the Malta Station in 1819, she was instrumental in the apprehension of a British pirate vessel.

The Navy sold Spey in 1822. She then was sold to the government of Gran Colombia and renamed Boyacá. The vessel participated in the Battle of Lake Maracaibo in 1823, and took part in the capture of numerous Spanish vessels, including the Spanish frigate Ceres, in 1824. She was laid up in 1827, and thereafter disappears from naval records.

Royal Navy
Spey immediately went into Ordinary after launch. Then in 1814 Spey was under the command of Captain Hew Stewart. She received a double bottom to the line of flotation and was fitted for sea at Portsmouth between December 1814 and 7 February 1815.

Captain George Fergusson commissioned her in December 1814, and she was fitted for foreign service at Woolwich between September and December 1815. Captain John Lake recommissioned her in October.

On 15 November 1816 Captain James Arthur Murray was promoted to post captain and command of Spey. He then sailed her for the Cape of Good Hope and St Helena. In 1818 she was under the command of Captain James Kearney White, and then on 12 August 1819 Captain Frederick Noel was promoted to post captain and command of Spey for the Mediterranean.

Capture of a pirate
On 3 October the brig Frederick, under the command of Lieutenant Hobson, of Spey, brought the brig William, of Liverpool, into Malta with Delano, her master, and her entire crew (less the steward who had escaped), in chains. It was expected that Captain Delano and his men would be tried on 26 October at Malta for piracy and possibly murder, Williams mate being missing.

William had earlier left Malta and then plundered an American vessel and a Portuguese one. One vessel she had plundered was Helen, Cornish, master, that had been on her way from Liverpool to Leghorn and Genoa. Merchants in Malta requested assistance from the Royal Navy to chase William and apprehend the pirates. The insurance companies in Malta hired Frederick to look for William. Noel contributed Lieutenant Hobson to command Frederick, and Spey and Racehorse also contributed a midshipman and 18 seamen to man Frederick. She had two men from Helen aboard and they identified William in the harbour at Smyrna. Hobson put his men into two boats, one towing the other, which was covered, and they rowed up to William, boarded her, and arrested the crew. Frederick and William arrived back at Malta on 3 October.

The pirates were found guilty and eight were sentenced to death, though the Governor of Malta extended clemency to two. The death sentence stipulated that William be painted black and towed out to the middle of the harbour of Valletta, and that the pirates be hanged on her. Captain Charles Christopher Delano and five of his men were hanged on 4 February 1820. The bodies were then taken down and those of Delano and three of his men were placed in gibbets erected at Fort Ricasoli. (The remaining two hanged pirates were buried below the gibbets.)

In 1820 Spey was under the command of Commander John Boswell, who had joined Spey on 12 August 1819, and who had returned with her to Portsmouth on 9 August 1821. In September 1821 Commander Charles Phillips replaced Boswell. Spey was paid-off on 28 September 1821.

Disposal
The "Principal Officers and Commissioners of His Majesty's Navy" offered "Spey sloop, of 20 guns 463 tons", "lying at Chatham", for sale on 18 April 1822. She was sold on that day to Mr. Vincent for £1,350.

Navy of Gran Colombia
On 27 February 1821 the representative of the New Granada Patriots in London, Luis López Méndez (the Extraordinary and Plenipotentiary Minister of Venezuela), agreed to a loan of £150,000 from the merchant James Mackintosh to cover the purchase of arms and equipment for 10,000 men, and three vessels. López Méndez was not authorized to sign such an agreement and Mackintosh may have known it. The Colombia government never ratified the agreement.

Mackintosh acquired three vessels, Tarántula, Lady Boringdon, and Spey, and in 1822 sent them out. The Colombians initially refused to accept the cargo, but the fall of Maracaibo to the Royalists on 7 September 1822 caused them to change their minds. They then took the equipment and took over the three vessels for their navy. Tarantula appears to have retained her name, or perhaps was sent on her way. Lady Boringdon became Constitución and Spey Boyacá.

In 1823 Boyacá participated in the Battle of Lake Maracaibo.

Later in 1823 and 1824 she was a member of a small squadron under Rene Beluche that patrolled the Caribbean. Boyacá and Bolivar reportedly freed a number of British and French ships that the Spanish Royalists had captured. They also captured 15 Royalist vessels.

A list of vessels making up a Colombian squadron cruising in the Gulf of Maracaibo in 1823 under the command of Rene Beluche included "Bolivar corvette", of 25 guns and 250 men. The list did not include Boyacá.

On 4 April 1824 Boyacá, Captain Brown, and Bolivar, Captain Clark, with Beluche the overall commander, encountered the Spanish frigate Ceres just off Havana. 
Bolivar: 22 × 32-pounder carronades + 1 × 12-pounder gun, and 156 men
Boyacá: 22 × 32-pounder carronades + 2 × 32-pounder gunnades, and 140 men
Ceres:26 × French 18-pounder long guns + 2 chase guns, and 396 men
In the subsequent action Ceres suffered 30 men killed and 60 wounded, half of whom died of their wounds. The Colombian Patriots had five wounded, including Beluche. The Colombians captured Ceres and took her into Pensacola, Florida, arriving there on 25 April. The Colombian vessels underwent repairs. Ceres was so damaged that she had to be scrapped.

Fate
Lloyd's List reported on 15 May 1827 that Boyacá, of 22 guns, had been laid up at Cartagena (Colombia) in a dismasted state.

Notes, citations, and references
Notes

Citations

References

Mulhall, Michael George (1878) The English in South America. (London: E. Standard).
Rodriguez, Moises Enrique  (2006) Freedom's Mercenaries: British Volunteers in the Wars of Independence of Latin America. (Hamilton Books).

External links
 

1814 ships
Cyrus-class post ships
Ships involved in anti-piracy efforts
Ships of the Colombian Navy